Bostancı is a neighbourhood of Kadıköy, located on the Anatolian side of Istanbul, Turkey, on the shore of the Sea of Marmara. As the easternmost neighbourhood of the Kadıköy district; it borders Suadiye and Kozyatağı (also neighbourhoods of Kadıköy) to the west, İçerenköy (a neighbourhood of Ataşehir) to the north, and Altıntepe (a neighbourhood of Maltepe) to the east.

A predominantly residential area, Bostancı is an important transport interchange with stops on the Marmaray and M4 Metro lines and ferries leaving for the Princes' Islands in the Sea of Marmara. It is generally considered the starting point of Bağdat Avenue, the major shopping street that runs as far as Kadıköy. 

Because of its position on the water, Bostanci has several fish restaurants. It is also popular as a place to stop off for late night fast food. Several places stay open all night serving people returning from the bars and clubs on Bağdat Avenue.

History 
In the Byzantine period Bostanci was probably called Poleatikon. When the emperors returned from campaigning in Anatolia, the city chief would greet them here and it is thought that there was a palace for the emperor here. 

When the Umayyad forces besieged Constantinople (now Istanbul) in 718, their navy took refuge in the port here.

During the Ottoman period, the main road connecting the capital to Anatolia passed through Bostancı, which was the eastern border of the city. A Bostanji (a type of imperial guard, whose name literally means "gardener" in Turkish) outpost was established here where they could control the entrances and exits to Istanbul. The neighbourhood took its name from this outpost.

Transport
From Bostancı, five of the Princes' Islands - Kınalıada, Burgazada, Heybeliada, Büyükada and Sivriada - can be seen. Bostancı is also an important interchange for the Asian side of Istanbul with copious city buses, sea buses, commuter ferries, trains and dolmuşes. All intercity trains heading for Anatolia stop at Bostancı railway station, which is opposite the Bostancı pier.

Bus system

 2 Balaban

4 Ring
10B Kadıköy
10S Kadıköy
17S Yenimahalle
128 Mecidiyeköy-Mezarlık
129T Taksim
134BK Yahya Tahir Sokak
Metro
M4 Kadıköy-Sabiha Gökçen International Airport

Ferryboats
Inner city
İDO Kadıköy
İDO Kabataş
İDO Kadıköy-Yenikapı-Bakırköy
İDO Maltepe
İDO Büyükada-Heybeliada-Burgazada-Kınalıada-Kabataş
Intercity
İDO Kartal-Yalova
İDO Yenikapı-Armutlu
İDO Yenikapı-Marmara-Avşa
Suburban train
Marmaray Train Line (Halkalı - Gebze)

Images

References

External links
 Miscellaneous images of Bostancı 

Neighbourhoods of Kadıköy
Fishing communities in Turkey
Restaurant districts and streets in Turkey